

Key

Selections

Notable undrafted players
Note: No drafts held before 1920

References

Iowa

Iowa Hawkeyes NFL Draft